In cricket, a player is said to have scored a century when he scores 100 or more runs in a single innings. The Asia Cup is a One Day International (ODI) tournament organised by the Asian Cricket Council, a subordinate of the International Cricket Council (ICC). Originally started as a biennial tournament in 1984, it has since been organised 14 times as of the latest edition in 2018. Since its inception, a total of 53 centuries have been scored by 43 players from five different teams—Bangladesh, India, Pakistan, Sri Lanka and Hong Kong. Affiliate teams such as Afghanistan and the United Arab Emirates are yet to have a centurion. Pakistan and India have scored the most centuries with 16 each, while Bangladesh has the least with six centuries.

Notable Records 
The first player to score a century in the tournament was Pakistan's Moin-ul-Atiq, who made 105 against Bangladesh in the third edition (1988). In the same match, his teammate Ijaz Ahmed scored 124 not out. 
India's Navjot Singh Sidhu and Sachin Tendulkar were the lone centurions of the 1990 and 1995 tournaments, respectively. 
The 2008 edition saw 13 centuries—the highest for a tournament—while no centuries were made in 1984 and 1986. 
Sri Lanka's Sanath Jayasuriya holds the record for the most centuries (six), followed by his compatriot Kumar Sangakkara, (four)and Virat Kohli (India),(four). Shoaib Malik (Pakistan) follows these three with three centuries . 
Sangakkara's three centuries in the 2008 tournament is a record for a single edition. 
Pakistan's Shahid Afridi made two centuries in the 2010 edition while playing as a captain, the most in the tournament history. His second century, which came against Bangladesh when he made 124 at the Rangiri Dambulla International Stadium, is the fastest in terms of balls faced in Asia cup matches. 
Kohli's 183 against Pakistan in 2012 is the highest individual score as of 2014.

The 2016 Asia Cup and 2022 Asia Cup are the only tournament played in the Twenty20 format. Hong Kong's Babar Hayat is first centurion of the Twenty20 format; he made 122 (off 60 balls) against Oman.

Key

ODI Centuries

T20I Centuries

Notes

References

Bibliography

Centuries
Asia Cup
Asia Cup centuries